Lahoucine Kharbouch (born 14 January 1986) is a French professional footballer who currently plays for SAS Épinal as a midfielder. He previously played in Ligue 2 with Istres.

Career statistics

References
 Lahoucine Kharbouch at foot-national.com
 
 

1986 births
Living people
People from La Garenne-Colombes
French footballers
Association football midfielders
Racing Club de France Football players
FC Istres players
Paris FC players
AS Cannes players
AS Beauvais Oise players
SAS Épinal players
Ligue 2 players
Championnat National players
Footballers from Hauts-de-Seine